Twenty-one, XXI or 21 may refer to:

21 (number), the natural number following 20 and preceding 22
 The years 21 BC, AD 21, 1921, 2021

Films
21 (2008 film), starring Kevin Spacey, Laurence Fishburne, Jim Sturgess, and Kate Bosworth
Twenty-One (1991 film), starring Patsy Kensit
Twenty-One (1923 film), starring Richard Barthelmess
Twenty-One (1918 film), starring Bryant Washburn

Music
XXI (band), a band formerly known as A Feast for Kings
Twenty One Pilots, American musical duo

Albums
21 (EP), a 2015 EP by Hunter Hayes
21 (Omarion album), 2006
21 (Adele album), 2011
21 (Rage album), 2012

Twenty One (Geri Allen album), 1994
Twenty One (Mystery Jets album), 2008
Twenty 1, a 1991 album by Chicago
XXI, a 2015 box set by Rammstein

Songs
"21" (The Paddingtons song), 2004
"21" (Hunter Hayes song), 2015
"21" (Polo G song), 2020
"21", a song by South Korean singer Dean featured on 130 mood: TRBL, 2016
"21", a song by Corey Hart on Young Man Running
"21", a 2015 song by Cory Marks from This Man
"21", a 2010 song by Flo Rida from Only One Flo (Part 1)
"21", a 2018 song by Mitch James
21?!, a 2008 song and EP by Marya Roxx
"Twenty One", a song by The Shirelles
"Twenty One", a song by Khalid from Free Spirit
"Twenty-One", a song by The Eagles from Desperado
"Twenty One", a song by The Cranberries from No Need to Argue
"Twenty One", a song by Corey Smith
"21", a song by DaBaby

Games and sports
Twenty-One (card game), forerunner of Blackjack and Pontoon
21 (drinking game), a counting game
 21, also "Counting to 21 game" or "21 game", a Nim-style counting game
Twenty-one (basketball), a basketball variation
Twenty-One (game show), an American game show from 1956 to 1958 and in 2000
Catch 21, an American game show based on Blackjack

Other uses
21 (novel) or The Final Unfinished Voyage of Jack Aubrey, by Patrick O'Brian, 2004
"21" (Boardwalk Empire), an episode of the Boardwalk Empire television series
21 Club, a former restaurant and nightclub in New York City
Twentyone Lake, a lake in Minnesota
21 Savage, an Atlanta-based rapper

See also
021 (disambiguation)
Twenty to One, a 1935 British musical comedy
List of highways numbered 21